Salmanbeyli is a Turkic place name. It may refer to:

 Salmanbəyli, a village and municipality in the Aghjabadi Rayon, Azerbaijan
 Salmanbeyli, Seyhan, a village in the district of Seyhan, Adana Province, Turkey